The Wisconsin Rapids Twins were a Class A Minor League Baseball team that existed from 1963 to 1983, playing in the Midwest League. Affiliated with the Washington Senators (1963) and the Minnesota Twins (1964-1983), they were located in Wisconsin Rapids, Wisconsin, United States. They played their home games at Witter Field. The franchise evolved from the Wisconsin Rapids White Sox  of the Wisconsin State League (1940–42, 1946–53). For the 1984 season, the franchise became the Kenosha Twins, moving to Kenosha, Wisconsin.

Despite the fact that they existed for 21 seasons, the Twins were Midwest League Champions only once, defeating the Danville Warriors 2 games to 1 and winning the 1973 Championship,  after having lost to the Appleton Foxes in the 1967 Championship Series.

Ballpark
They played their home games at Witter Field, located at 521 Lincoln Street in Wisconsin Rapids, Wisconsin. Built in 1928, it served as the home park for multiple minor league teams: the Wisconsin Rapids White Sox (1941–42; 1946–53) of the Class-D Wisconsin State League. The League folded after the 1953 season, leaving Witter without professional baseball until a new team in the Class-A Midwest League started play. The  Wisconsin Rapids Senators (1963) and Wisconsin Rapids Twins (1964–1983) would play for the next two decades.  Following the 1983 season, the franchise moved to Simmons Field in Kenosha, Wisconsin.

Today, the park is home to the Wisconsin Rapids Rafters of the summer collegiate Northwoods League, who began play in 2010 .

Notable alumni
The player to win the first Triple Crown in Midwest League history played for the Twins – Elmore "Moe" Hill. In 1974, he led the league with a .339 average, 32 home runs and 113 RBI.

 Allan Anderson (1983) 1988 AL ERA Leader
 Steve Barber (1969) 2 x MLB All-Star
 Randy Bass (1973)
 Steve Braun (1967)
 Bud Bulling (1975–76)
 Bill Campbell (1971) MLB All-Star; 1977 AL Saves Leader'''
 John Castino (1976) 1979 AL Rookie of the Year
 Rick Dempsey (1968–69) 1983 World Series MVP
 Jim Eisenreich (1980–81) First Recipient of Tony Conigliaro Award
 Gary Gaetti (1980)  2 x MLB All-Star 
 Jerry Garvin (1974)
 Johnny Goryl (1970, 1973–75, MGR) 
 Tom Hall (1967)
 Kent Hrbek (1980) MLB AS
 Pat Kelly (1964) MLB All-Star
 Dave McKay (1971) 
 Charlie Manuel (1967, MGR 1983) Manager: 2008 World Series Champion - Philadelphia Phillies
 George Mitterwald (1965, 1968)
 Graig Nettles (1966) 6 x MLB All-Star 1976 AL Home Run Leader
 Mark Portugal (1982)
 Rick Stelmaszek (1978-80 MGR)
 Gary Ward (1974) 2 x MLB All-Star
 Alvis Woods (1974)

Year-by-year record

References

Baseball teams established in 1963
Baseball teams disestablished in 1983
Defunct Midwest League teams
Professional baseball teams in Wisconsin
Minnesota Twins minor league affiliates
Washington Senators (1961–1971) minor league affiliates
Sports in Wisconsin Rapids, Wisconsin
Defunct baseball teams in Wisconsin